New World Order is a 2009 American documentary film directed by Luke Meyer and Andrew Neel. It explores conspiracy theorists who are committed to vigorously opposing what they believe to be an emerging "New World Order".

Plot
The film concentrates on the activities of Alex Jones, Jim Tucker, Jack McLamb, and Luke Rudkowski, with particular focus on their efforts to expose the highly secretive meetings of the Bilderberg Group, promote the 9/11 Truth Movement, and oppose what they see as the erosion of traditional American, Constitutionally-based civil and political rights and liberties.

Critical reception
In his review of the film for the magazine Wired, Lewis Wallace writes, "As New World Order follows Jones and some of his fellow conspiracy mongers, it delivers a fascinating look at true believers who are desperate to expose the supposed sins of politicians and business chieftains...the movie introduces the real people whose lives are in some instances consumed by these exotic ideas."

In his IGN review, Christopher Monfette writes, "New World Order is a fascinating, confusing, moving, frustrating, multi-layered documentary that sheds light on a group we might otherwise purposefully keep in the darkness. Without agenda or judgment, we are left to decide on our own how we feel, and for a documentary in a day when documentaries are notoriously manipulative, that's a mark of excellence."

Don R. Lewis writes for Film Threat, "New World Order is an intriguing, evenhanded peek into a world all around us that we never really see."

See also
Darkon, another documentary from the same director and producer

References

External links

Independent Film Channel website
Review at Dossier Journal

2009 films
American documentary films
American independent films
Documentary films about conspiracy theories
2009 documentary films
SeeThink Films films
Films directed by Andrew Neel
Pseudoscience documentary films
2000s English-language films
2000s American films
2009 independent films